Lyatoshinka is a rural locality (a selo) and the administrative center of Lyatoshinskoye Rural Settlement, Staropoltavsky District, Volgograd Oblast, Russia. The population was 632 as of 2010. There are 11 streets.

Geography 
Lyatoshinka is located on the left bank of the Yeruslan River, 21 km northeast of Staraya Poltavka (the district's administrative centre) by road. Lugovskoye is the nearest rural locality.

References 

Rural localities in Staropoltavsky District